The territory of Croatia is divided by the Croatian Bureau of Statistics into small settlements, in Croatian naselje (singular, pl. naselja). They indicate existing or former human settlement (similar to the United States census designated places or the UK census output areas - OA) and are not necessarily incorporated places. Rather, the administrative units (local authorities) are cities (grad, pl. gradovi) and municipalities (općina, pl. općine), which are composed of one or more settlements. , there are 6,749 settlements in Croatia.

Rural individual settlements are usually referred to as selo (village; pl. sela). Municipalities (or communes) in Croatia comprise one or more, usually, rural settlements. A city usually includes an eponymous large settlement which in turn consists of several urban and suburban settlements. The Constitution of Croatia allows a naselje or a part thereof to form some form of local government. This form of local government is typically used to subdivide larger municipalities and cities; municipality may comprise several units named mjesni odbor (local committee/board), a city usually consists of several units (which may comprise one or more settlements) named gradski kotar/gradska četvrt (city district or borough; pl. gradski kotari/gradske četvrti), and/or mjesni odbor (local committee/board; pl. mjesni odbori).

Historically, the methodology of delineating settlements in Croatia changed substantially in the first decade after World War II, when the number of settlements was recorded at 12,044 in the 1948 census, but then reduced to 6,704 in the 1953 census. At the time, the definition of a settlement was an inhabited place with a separate name, an independent settlement was a settlement that had a distinct territory, and a non-independent one was one that was inside another one's territory. Independent ones therefore included cities, towns, market towns, villages and places where people were settled or colonized.

See also 
 Census-designated place
 Cadastral municipality (katastarska općina)

References 

Subdivisions of Croatia